Kaimri may refer to:
Kaimri, Hisar, village in Hisar district, Haryana, India.
Kaimri, Rajasthan, village in Karauli district, Rajasthan, India.
Kaimri, Estonia, village in Saaremaa Parish, Saare County, Estonia.